Al-Thulth is a sub-district located in Jabal Iyal Yazid District, 'Amran Governorate, Yemen.  had a population of 2234 according to the 2004 census.

References 

Sub-districts in Jabal Iyal Yazid District